The 1940 season was the 11th completed season of Finnish Football League Championship but was played as a cup competition.

Overview

The 1940 Mestaruussarja  could not be played and a cup competition was held instead.

Semi-finals

Championship final

Footnotes

References

Mestaruussarja seasons
Fin
Fin
Mestaruussarja